Nur Ahmad Jan Bughra (died April 16, 1934) was an Uighur Emir of the First East Turkestan Republic. He was the younger brother of Muhammad Amin Bughra and Abdullah Bughra. He commanded Uighur and Kirghiz forces during the Battle of Kashgar (1934) against the Chinese Muslim 36th Division (National Revolutionary Army). The Chinese Muslims were loyal to the Republic of China government and wanted to crush the Turkic Muslim Uighurs and Kirghiz in revenge for the Kizil massacre, in which Nur Ahmad Jan Bughra had taken part. He was killed on April 16, 1934, at Yangi Hissar by Chinese Muslim troops under generals Ma Zhancang and Ma Fuyuan. All of Nur Ahmad Jan's 2,500 Uighur and Kirghiz fighters were exterminated by the 10,000 strong Chinese Muslim army.

It was reported by Ahmad Kamal in his book Land Without Laughter, that Nur Ahmad Jan was beheaded by the Chinese Muslim troops and the head was used in a football game at the parade ground.

References

External links
 The Soviets in Xinjiang (1911–1949) by Mark Dickens

Uyghurs
East Turkestan independence activists
1934 deaths
Young Kashgar Party politicians
Republic of China politicians from Xinjiang
People from Hotan
Year of birth missing